20 Standards (Quartet) 2003 is a live album 4CD box set by American composer and saxophonist Anthony Braxton recorded in Europe in 2003 and released on the Leo label in 2005.

Reception

The AllMusic review by François Couture states:

All About Jazz reviewer Christinan Carey noted:

Track listing
Disc One:
 "All the Things You Are" (Jerome Kern, Oscar Hammerstein II) - 20:08
 "Lines for Lyons" (Gerry Mulligan) - 13:53
 "April in Paris" (Vernon Duke, Yip Harburg) - 12:25
 "Green Dolphin Street" (Bronisław Kaper, Ned Washington) - 16:07
 "Blues for Alice" (Charlie Parker) - 13:32 
Disc Two: 
 "Alone Together" (Howard Dietz, Arthur Schwartz) - 18:32
 "Waltz for Debbie" (Bill Evans) - 12:28
 "For Heaven's Sake" (Elise Bretton, Sherman Edwards, Donald Meyer) - 13:40
 "Freedom Jazz Dance" (Eddie Harris) - 14:48
 "The Song Is You" (Kern, Hammerstein) - 19:12	 
Disc Three: 
 "The Duke" (Dave Brubeck) - 12:24
 "I Love You" (Cole Porter) - 13:48
 "Lonnie's Lament" (John Coltrane) - 8:05
 "Blue Rondo à la Turk" (Brubeck) - 14:42
 "Invitation" (Kaper) - 17:09 
Disc Four: 
 "Tune Up" (Miles Davis) - 19:15
 "Remember" (Irving Berlin) - 18:03
 "Moonlight in Vermont" (John Blackburn, Karl Suessdorf) - 15:05
 "Take Five" (Paul Desmond) - 10:24
 "Serenity" (Joe Henderson) - 13:25
Recorded on February 19 at De Singel in Antwerp, Belgium (Disc Three: tracks 1, 3, & 5 and Disc Four: track 5), on February 22 at Flagey in Brussels, Belgium (Disc Three: track 4), on November 11 at Teatro Central in Sevilla, Spain (Disc Four: track 1), on November 12 at New Morning in Paris, France (Disc Two: track 5 and Disc Four: track 2), on November 13 at Nevers Jazz Festival in Nevers, France (Disc One: tracks 1 & 3-5), on November 14 at The Vooruit in Gent, Belgium (Disc Two: tracks 1-4, Disc Three: track 2 and Disc For: track 3), on November 17 at Teatro Filarmonico in Verona, Italy (Disc Four: track 4), and on November 20 at Auditorio da Universidade de Minho in Guimaraes, Portugal (Disc One: track 2)

Personnel
Anthony Braxton - reeds 
Kevin O'Neil - guitar
Andy Eulau - bass
Kevin Norton - percussion

References

Leo Records live albums
Anthony Braxton live albums
2005 live albums